This is a list of Temple tanks in terms of area.

List of large Temple tanks

See also
 List of large Hindu temples
 List of tallest Gopurams
 List of human stampedes in Hindu temples
 Lists of Hindu temples by country

References 

 
Hinduism-related lists

Lists of Hindu buildings and structures
Lists of religious buildings and structures in India